Eriachne (common name Wanderrie grass) is a genus of plants in the grass family. Most of the species are found only in Australia, with the ranges of a few extending northward into New Guinea, parts of Asia, and Micronesia.

It is found in areas such as the Western Australian Mulga shrublands ecoregion.

Around 48 species are recognised:

Eriachne agrostidea – NT, Qld
Eriachne aristidea – NT, Qld, WA, SA, NSW
Eriachne armitii – NT, Qld, WA, NG
Eriachne avenacea – NT, WA
Eriachne axillaris – NT
Eriachne basalis – NT, Qld
Eriachne basedowii – NT
Eriachne benthamii – NT, Qld, WA, SA
Eriachne bleeseri – NT
Eriachne burkittii – NT, Qld, WA, NG
Eriachne capillaris – NT
Eriachne ciliata – NT, Qld, WA
Eriachne compacta – NT
Eriachne fastigiata – NT, WA
Eriachne festucacea – NT, WA
Eriachne filiformis – NT, Qld, WA
Eriachne flaccida – NT, Qld, WA, SA
Eriachne gardneri – WA
Eriachne glabrata – Qld, NSW
Eriachne glandulosa – NT, WA
Eriachne glauca – NT, Qld, WA
Eriachne helmsii – NT, Qld, WA, SA, NSW
Eriachne humilis – NT, Qld, NG
Eriachne imbricata – WA
Eriachne insularis – Qld
Eriachne lanata – WA
Eriachne major – NT, Qld, WA
Eriachne melicacea – NT, Qld, WA
Eriachne minuta – NT
Eriachne mucronata – NT, Qld, WA, SA, NSW
Eriachne nervosa – NT, Qld, WA
Eriachne nodosa – NT, WA
Eriachne obtusa – NT, Qld, WA, NG
Eriachne ovata – NT, Qld, WA, SA
Eriachne pallescens – Southeast Asia, Indian Subcontinent, Fujian, Guangdong, Guangxi, Jiangxi, Nansei Shoto, NG, NT, Qld, NSW, Caroline Islands
Eriachne pauciflora – NT, WA
Eriachne pulchella – NT, Qld, WA, SA, NSW
Eriachne rara – Qld, NSW
Eriachne schultziana – NT
Eriachne scleranthoides – NT, Qld, SA
Eriachne semiciliata – NT, Qld, WA
Eriachne squarrosa – NT, Qld, WA, NG, Maluku
Eriachne stipacea – NT, Qld, WA
Eriachne sulcata – NT, WA
Eriachne tenuiculmis – WA
Eriachne triodioides – NT, Qld, WA
Eriachne triseta – India, Sri Lanka, Indochina, Malaysia, Indonesia, Philippines, NG, NT, Qld, WA
Eriachne vesiculosa – NT, Qld

Several other species were formerly included (see Alloteropsis, Deschampsia, Digitaria and Pentameris).

Eriachne ampla – Pentameris ampla
Eriachne assimilis – Pentameris ecklonii
Eriachne aurea – Pentameris aurea
Eriachne capensis – Pentameris malouinensis
Eriachne ecklonii – Pentameris ecklonii
Eriachne malouinensis – Pentameris malouinensis
Eriachne melicacea var. fragrans – Alloteropsis cimicina
Eriachne microphylla – Pentameris microphylla
Eriachne montana – Deschampsia flexuosa
Eriachne pallida – Pentameris ampla
Eriachne rigida – Digitaria californica
Eriachne steudelii – Pentameris malouinensis
Eriachne tuberculata Nees 1841 not Domin 1912 – Pentameris setifolia

References

Micrairoideae
Grasses of Asia
Grasses of Oceania
Poaceae genera